Benimakia fastigium is a species of sea snail, a marine gastropod mollusc in the family Fasciolariidae, the spindle snails, the tulip snails and their allies.

Description

Distribution

References

 Snyder M.A. & Vermeij G.J. (2008). Two additions to the fasciolariid genus Benimakia. Novapex 9(1): 49-51

External links
 Reeve, L. A. (1847). Monograph of the genus Turbinella. In: Conchologia Iconica, or, illustrations of the shells of molluscous animals, vol. 4, pl. 1-13 and unpaginated text. L. Reeve & Co., London

Fasciolariidae
Gastropods described in 1847